The American Art Collaborative (AAC) is a consortium of 14 art museums in the United States, whose mission is the establishment of "a critical mass of linked open data (LOD) on the semantic web."

Membership
As of 2018, the 14 members were:

 Amon Carter Museum of American Art
 Archives of American Art, Smithsonian Institution
 Autry Museum of the American West
 Colby College Museum of Art
 Crystal Bridges Museum of American Art
 Dallas Museum of Art (DMA)
 Indianapolis Museum of Art (IMA)
 Thomas Gilcrease Institute of American History and Art
 National Portrait Gallery, Smithsonian Institution
 National Museum of Wildlife Art
 Princeton University Art Museum
 Smithsonian American Art Museum
 Walters Art Museum
 Yale Center for British Art

References

External links
 

2014 establishments in the United States
Arts organizations established in 2014
American Art Collaborative
Arts organizations based in the United States
Consortia in the United States
Museum associations and consortia
Open data
Semantic Web